Hiserøyna or Hisarøyna is an island in Gulen Municipality in Vestland county, Norway. The island is located south of the Sognesjøen and north of the Gulafjorden. In 2001, there were 43 residents living on the island.

History
The coastline is rocky and has several fjords which cut into the island. Most of the island is unsuitable for habitation. The island's inhabitants live in just a few farm areas: Nyhammaren (on the east coast), Stemnebø and Vilsvika (on the south coast), Hjartås (central part of the island, along a fjord), and Straume (on the northern coast).

Transport
In September 2013, a cable ferry connection was opened connecting Hisarøyna to the mainland.  The regular ferry route takes about 8 minutes to cross the strait.  This is the first regular connection to the island.  It will carry up to 6 automobiles or one large truck.

See also
List of islands of Norway

References

Islands of Vestland
Gulen